Turkey Creek is a stream in Copiah County, Mississippi.

See also
List of rivers of Mississippi

References

Rivers of Mississippi
Landforms of Copiah County, Mississippi